Sara Rosalie Wahl (née Erwin; August 27, 1924 – July 22, 2013) was an American lawyer and judge and the first woman to serve on the Minnesota Supreme Court.

Early life of adversity and tragedy 
Born in Caney, Kansas, Wahl suffered several traumatic losses early in life.  Her mother died when she was three, and her grandmother and Aunt Sara raised her.   She learned early on how difficult it was for poor people to gain access to legal restitution.  When she was seven, she opened the railroad crossing gate for their horse-drawn wagon.  A late train that had failed to blow its whistle struck and killed her grandfather and younger brother while she watched in horror.  A local lawyer conditioned representation to seek personal injury recovery on $100 retainer, which, as Wahl recounted, "might have well have been a million" during the difficult times of the Depression.

A Quaker since college, Rosalie grew up Methodist.  In college, she worked to fight racism through the YWCA and lived in a racially-integrated communal home at the University of Kansas in the 1940s.  Having begun as a journalism major, she edited the Daily Kansan and became interested in the cooperative movement.  She dropped out and taught in the one-room school in Birch Creek that she herself had attended after her fiancé who had enlisted in the Air Force died in a military training accident in 1943.  She returned to school and earned her undergraduate degree in Sociology from the University of Kansas in 1946.  She later met, married, and moved to Minnesota with her husband, Roswell Wahl, and lived with friends on forty acres north of Circle Pines at what they hoped would be an intentional community.

An unconventional legal career 

Wahl's foray into political life sought to extend the reach of the county library system, but county board rejected the proposal.  After being ushered out of the room and not permitted to observe the board, Wahl decided she was tired of sitting outside of the rooms where men made decisions.

After giving birth to four children, she began attending William Mitchell Law School at night and gave birth to her fifth child during her second year. One other woman was in her class and only one woman, the law librarian, served on the faculty.

C. Paul Jones hired Wahl for the newly created public defender's office as an Assistant State Public Defender when she graduated in 1967 and allowed her to work part time.  (Wahl divorced in 1972.)  This work gave her experience defending the indigent but also provided numerous opportunities for appellate oral argument; she argued 109 cases before the Minnesota Supreme Court.

Her experience as a public defender led William Mitchell College of Law to hire her to establish a criminal and civil law clinic in 1973.  Law clinics expose students to the nuts and bolts of legal practice as opposed to appellate doctrinal exegesis.  She taught around sixty clinical students a year in addition to an appellate law seminar.  "Students stood in line all night before registration to be assured of a place in the clinic." The close bonds she formed with students and colleagues would help her in her campaign.

A passionate second-wave feminist 
Women did a lot of the work in state and local politics but were rarely tapped to run for office.  1966, Betty Kane had launched a statewide (Democratic Farmer Labor Party) DFL Women's Federation.  Yet there remained "a pervasive feeling that women were still being courted to act as the party's chore doers.  They rang the doorbells, distributed literature, poured the coffee, served as volunteer office helpers and campaign workers.  But they were rarely encouraged to seek delegate seats or elective office.

Esther Wattenberg's report for the DFL Feminist Caucus captured the sense of the day: women were Present but Powerless. The DFL Women's Caucus replaced the DFL Women's Federation in 1971 and morphed into the DFL Feminist Caucus in 1973 to fight for feminism within the party—to pressure the party to run more women candidates and to ensure that DFL candidates were pro-choice.  In January of 1977, Perpich formally addressed the DFL Feminist Caucus, the first governor to do so.   In response to a question, Perpich promised to fill the next vacancy on the Supreme Court with a woman leading to banner newspaper Minneapolis Star headlines the next day saying "Woman in top court promised."

Minnesota's system of judicial selection 
Minnesota's system is a hybrid between appointment and election.

Formally, supreme court justices run for office with no party designation, but in practice, sitting justices inform the governor when they are going to step down, and the governor nominates a replacement when the retirement is announced, allowing the nominee to run as an incumbent.  If a justice was appointed more than a year before the next election, he or she had to stand in the next one, and then again every six years.  As of 1977, only one member of the Minnesota Supreme Court, C. Donald Peterson, had obtained his seat by election rather than appointment.  The last incumbent unseated in an election was in 1900.  Serious challenges to sitting justices were rare.

Although women were gaining entry into law schools and their numbers inched upwards in the 1970a, few served as judges.  In 1977, no woman had served on the U.S. Supreme Court, only one woman sat on a federal appellate court, and only five other women served on state supreme courts.  The first woman to serve as a Minnesota trial court judge, Susanne C. Sedgwick, a Republican, acquired a seat on the Hennepin County court by running against an incumbent in 1970.

Identifying women candidates 
Along with the Minnesota Women's Political Caucus, Minnesota Women Lawyers was determined to identify qualified women.  MWL formed a committee and sent a questionnaire to all women lawyers asking if they would be willing to serve on boards or on the bench.  Wahl had never practiced before a woman judge and did not send her questionnaire back for two years.  Finally, she decided "well, you know, there comes a point when if you're urging the appointment of women, you just have to put up or shut up.  So then I decided, yeah.  I said yes."

Judith L. Oakes chaired Minnesota Women Lawyers' endorsement committee and it winnowed a list of eighteen names to seven (Doris Huspeni, Phyllis Gene Jones, Roberta Levy, Delores Orey, Susanne Sedgwick, Esther Tomljanovich, and Rosalie Wahl).  Wahl was also on lists that the Minnesota Women's Political Caucus and DFL Feminist Caucus submitted to Governor Perpich.   University of Minnesota law professor Roberta Levy and Hennepin Municipal Judge Diana Murphy were ultimately the other two finalists.  (Levy later became the first woman Hennepin County District chief judge while Murphy was the first woman appointed to the federal bench from Minnesota and was later the first woman appointee to the Eighth Circuit of the U.S. Court of Appeals the least gender diverse of all the circuit courts).

Appointment to the Minnesota Supreme Court 

When President Carter nominated Senator Mondale's former law partner and associate justice of the Minnesota Supreme Court, Harry MacLaughlin, to the federal bench, Minneapolis Star reporter Gwen Jones wrote a front-page column reminding the governor and all readers of his promise.  Governor Perpich did not name his appointee as the news of MacLaughlin's elevation broke.  Instead, he announced he would appoint a yet-to-be identified woman.

Perpich knew that the first woman appointed would have many challengers who wanted a seat on the Supreme Court.  If she were defeated, he would then have squandered the power to shape the bench. Another unpredictable populist governor, Jerry Brown of California, had appointed a woman, Rose Bird, as the first woman and the first chief justice of the California Supreme Court in February of 1977.  Bird just barely held her seat in 1978 but subsequently lost a retention election in a vicious campaign.  

Carol Connolly promised the governor that she would manage Wahl’s campaign.  If Wahl lost, future governors might it conclude it was too risky to appoint a woman. 

In 1978, St. Paul attorney and chair of the Minnesota Women Lawyers endorsement committee Judith Oakes would reflect that "no other government appointment has stirred as much emotion as Wahl."  On Friday, June 3rd 1977, at a gathering of nearly 4,500 women meeting in St. Cloud Minnesota to hammer out a platform and choose delegates to the upcoming White House Conference on Women in Houston, conference chair Minnesota Secretary of State Joan Growe announced that Governor Rudy Perpich would appoint Rosalie Wahl to the state supreme court—the first woman and its 72nd justice.  The crowd erupted as Wahl came to the microphone.  Wahl promised to "not cease to be an advocate for those whose rights have been denied or infringed. . . . I am remembering tonight, all those generations of women who have gone before us.  I am remembering Elizabeth Cady Stanton, as a little girl in the mid-1820s, walking into her father's law office with a pair of sharp scissors and a novel plan to amend the laws by cutting from his law books all the bad laws he had shown her 'that made so many women cry'. . . . I am remembering that remarkable Quaker, Susan B. Anthony, who met Elizabeth Cady Stanton at the Second Women's Rights convention in 1852 . . . they knew scorn, fury, hardship, adventure, agonizing disappointment.  And they never even saw the promised land.  I am remembering Mary Peek's grandmother, Kari Sougstand Anderson, as a young woman in Norway, refusing to marry the man chosen by her father, asking for her dowry, coming to the new world alone, knowing no English—as an old woman of 78 years, being the first person in line to vote at the first election after the ratification of the 19th Amendment.  I am remembering Sojourner Truth—and all those brave, unnamed, unremembered women, who gave so much that we might have the freedom and opportunity that is ours."

           Wahl spoke of being a mother of four starting law school, inspired to write this poem:

                Foot in nest

Wing in sky

                Bound by each

                Hover I

"Now," she said, "I know it is not necessary to hover.  Now I know it is possible to soar, to know the vastness of the sky and then come back, fully to the nest, enriched by the vision of the whole and by the exercise."  As Judge Harriet Lansing recalls, "Rosalie's carefully chosen words left so indelible an impression that they were published in their entirety in the next morning's Minneapolis Star."  A reception in St. Paul on June 9th to celebrate the appointment, party activist Koryne Horbal clasped Wahl's hand and tearfully said, "Thank you for being ready."

Male challengers 
Wahl had little time to learn he new job before she had to campaign to keep it.  Men lawyers who wanted to serve on the Court saw an opening.  For the first time in two decades, a seated Supreme Court Justice had a serious opponent, or rather in Wahl’s case, three, meaning she would face a primary.  Ramsey County District Court Judge Jerome J. Plunkett, Rochester District Court Judge Daniel Foley, and former Attorney General Robert W. Mattson filed.  (Wahl’s first Supreme Court opinion, State v. Flowers, reversed one of Plunkett’s convictions.)  Her opponents criticized her lack of judicial experience.  Plunkett had diminished her significant experience arguing before the Supreme Court, calling her work at the clinic merely “taking students down and showing them where the criminal court was.”  Wahl won the primary, receiving 231,000 votes to the next highest vote getter Mattson’s 130,000, but Mattson picked up Plunkett’s criticisms in the general election.  Plunkett had received 93,319 votes and Foley 104,610.  If all those who voted for Plunkett and Foley voted for Mattson, Wahl would lose.

Mattson ran a series of negative ads giving reasons to vote against Wahl.  He claimed she had a poor win/loss record before the Supreme Court.  Another ad, patterned after the campaign against Rose Bird in California, charged that “Ms. [sic] Wahl lets rapists loose.”  (She was the sole dissenter in State v. Willis, (269 N.W.2d [Minn. 1978]) a case of a rapist who had held his victim at knifepoint.  Wahl had dissented because a trial court had suppressed evidence and the police had unlawfully searched the defendant’s house.)  Another ad charged she let drug dealers loose.

Supreme Court Justice C. Donald Peterson was also up for reelection and he faced a challenge from gay rights lawyer Jack Baker, who objected to the Court’s ruling refusing to recognize same-sex marriages.

Rosalie Wahl was the highest vote getter on the ballot in November 1978, holding on to her seat.  She became the tenth woman serving on a state supreme court in 1977. Four important factors helped ensure Wahl’s electoral success.  First, her colleagues supported her, unlike Chief Justice Rose Bird who ultimately failed to retain her seat in California.  She described her colleagues: "Justice Otis, Chief Justice Sheran, Justice Rogosheske, Justice Peterson, Justices Kelley, Yetka, Todd, and Scott—were my friends, my court, some of the finest men I have ever known.  I realized when I joined the court that my colleagues were all very much themselves.  They were just who they were and they did me the honor of just going on and being that way.  There was only one of me and I said little until I learned my way."

Wahl used the time after Perpich’s announcement before Justice McClaughlin vacated the seat to call on each justice individually to ask for his advice about the transition of becoming a supreme court justice.  As the seventh and most junior justice she spoke last at conference. Chief Justice Sandy Keith who joined the court later wrote of her ability to get along with others, "[t ]was the day-to-day life with Rosalie that made my first five and one-half years on the court so worthwhile.  There is no one on this earth who could so effectively tell me I was wrong or misled.  And because of her mannerisms and collegial methods, I would appreciate and often accept her scrutiny and advice without raising my voice, grumbling, or silence.  Her warm sense of humor and fairness often dominated the conference room."

Chief Justice Sheran had offered to reduce her caseload but she did not want to burden the other justices with extra cases. Justice Sheran observed: "Life taught Wahl to take a punch, and that ability helped her be productive in situations where a less resilient and tolerant person would have fled in frustration.  She appeared to be as comfortable with senior partners in the Manhattan boardroom at Sullivan & Cromwell as she was in southeastern Minnesota with a group of farm women.  Her grace in working with those who did not necessarily share her ideals is one of her strongest qualities, and it allowed her to accomplish projects in the face of repeated setbacks."

Wahl “never expressed frustration or demeaned her colleagues’ viewpoints.  Once, when she failed to convince the court to adopt her position, she only sighed that ‘my dear friends, the Court might be making a wrong decision.’”  Judge Peterson, who also faced a challenge, joined forces with Wahl and they campaigned together, allowing them to draw on an existing fund called the Lawyers Committee to Retain Incumbent Justices, already in place from past elections.  That fund gave them $10,000 as a base for the joint campaign and a chair already in place.

Second, Wahl actively campaigned and enjoyed widespread support.  Wahl recounted, "women were very crucial in this campaign because the women in the state knew that if I couldn’t be elected, no governor would appoint a woman, because it would be just throwing an appointment away.  So they really came together.  Nieces were writing to their grandmothers."  Carol Connolly and Bob Oliphant chaired the Citizens Committee to Retain Rosalie Wahl which ultimately raised about $29,000.  Mary Pruitt, historian of second wave feminism in the Twin Cities, described the Wahl campaign as “the single moment everyone [in a very fractious feminist movement] worked together.”. The Citizens Committee organized fundraising events and pulled in allies from the Minnesota Women’s Political Caucus and Minnesota Women lawyers who were nonpartisan, unlike the DFL Feminist Caucus.  (Judges in Minnesota run in nonpartisan elections with only the designation of incumbent.)

Wahl assembled a coalition of William Mitchell law alumni, faculty, and students, as well as elites and grassroots organizers for social change, from feminists, to public interest lawyers, to Quakers, to the League of Women Voters.  She also proved to be an effective campaigner.  Her down-home-folks style played well at backyard gatherings and house parties, her passion for the underdog often in evidence.  Mattson’s dishonesty in the debate before the Ramsey County Bar Association, his efforts to smear Wahl's son in the press, and negative campaign further aroused Wahl’s fighting spirit. While trying to conscientiously serve as a justice on the Supreme Court, Wahl traversed the state, speaking to bar associations, women’s groups, and other community organizations, such as churches and hospitals.  Wahl never succumbed to “black robe disease”—seeing herself as indistinguishable from the role and taking herself too seriously.  Wahl recalls the phone calls she used to trade with her friend Harriet Lansing, who was appointed to the Ramsey County District Court soon after Wahl was named to the Supreme Court.  ‘I would call up and say, ‘Is this Judge Lansing?’ and she would say, ‘Justice Wahl?’ and we’d go ‘Ho, Ho, Ho!’  Who are we at playing judges?  This is a role, and we’re the person in it; we don’t become indistinguishable.  I think there is the difference somewhat in men and women.” 

The third factor was the quality of the candidate.  Wahl was an experienced advocate—not from working for a prestigious law firm, but from defending the indigent as a public defender.  As a clinical law professor, Wahl not only supervised the students’ representation of complaints, but she had substantial experience arguing criminal law cases before the Supreme Court—appellate experience her challenger lacked.  She had the support of her colleagues on the bench, the wider legal community, women, and the political establishment of both parties.  After the primary, which eliminated the two trial judge candidates, the Minnesota State Bar Association took its traditional plebiscite on judicial candidates and Wahl got 2,547 votes to 779 for Robert Mattson Sr., the other top vote getter of the primary.  (The two district court judges with judicial experience lost in the primary.)

Fourth, Mattson’s negative campaign backfired.  The Minnesota State Bar Association, worried about the issue of judicial independence and uneasy about judicial elections, came to Wahl’s defense.  Chief Justice Sheran talked to friends at the Bar Association and they wrote a letter to the paper denouncing Mattson’s ads  The Minneapolis Tribune editorialized against “Mattson’s Injudicious Campaign” on October 22nd, saying his distortion of Wahl’s office rendered him unfit for office.  Wahl said she was lucky to face Mattson, in a way, “because a lot of lawyers did not think really highly of him.”

Impact on the law 
Republican Governor Al Quie appointed a second woman, Jeanne Coyne to the Supreme Court in 1982.  Wahl recounts that prior to that, she had not realized how isolated she actually was.  Wahl retained her seat easily without challenge in 1984.  Perpich went on to appoint more women than had been appointed by all of the previous governors of Minnesota combined.  He was the first governor to select a woman, Marlene Johnson, as his running mate for lieutenant governor.  Most of the women on Perpich’s first short list ultimately were appointed to the state or federal bench, if not the Minnesota Supreme Court.  Justice Tomljanovich recounted, “He appointed a lot of women without real big track records, and that was a real big risk, but it made a revolution.” 

Until Wahl retired in 1994, the Minnesota Supreme Court was the first state in history to have a majority (4 of 7) women justices.  Research on the effects of increasing numbers of women on the Minnesota Supreme Court showed little effect in voter participation in judicial races, an increased willingness on the part of lawyers to appeal women’s rights cases (which peaked at three justices), and some reports of an altered courtroom atmosphere.  Kathleen Blatz, a Republican, became the first woman chief justice in 1998, holding that office until 2006.  As Connolly concludes: “What once seemed unthinkable has become a yawn.”

Wahl had an enormous impact on the law, women’s equality, the legal system, and legal education.  She wrote 549 opinions over seventeen years.  She looked at the judicial system from the bottom up, championing the underdog, the marginalized, or the outcast, such as criminal defendants.  She believed that Minnesota’s constitution held the government to a higher standard of rationality than the federal constitution did the national government and argued for a more expansive interpretation of individual rights than under the U.S. Constitution (Larson 2000).  She wrote for the majority in holding that different penalties for crack and powder cocaine were unconstitutional in State v. Russell (477 N.W.2d 886 [Minn.1993]).  Her opinions on race and sex discrimination were especially important.  She had what her former clerk, Jane Larson, called “her longest running struggle with other members of the supreme court” over how to interpret statutes allowing for the availability of permanent rather than rehabilitative maintenance for long-term homemaker spouses.  Wahl would often say that she thought men had trouble understanding the experience of a midlife woman whose husband is divorcing her.

Her compassion for parents who might cross the line in seeking to “de-program” an adult child who has become part of a religious cult, or for parents seeking custody after divorce, or for those who hope to regain custody after a termination shines through her opinions.   As Court of Appeals Judge Harriet Lansing wrote: "Rosalie’s law school education (and mine) was obtained during the years of the highly vaunted 'reasonable man standard.'  As far as we could tell, the words meant what they said and extended some distance beyond tort liability.  We noted right off the absence of reasonable women from the equation, but lately I’ve been wondering whether we might have not overlooked something in the initially acceptable category of “reasonable.”  As it evolved in legal opinions, this “reason can be confined to very narrow categories bereft of human qualities, or it can be used to disguise a received (and maybe only arguably reasonable) set of social assumptions.  Rosalie’s opinions, in both her use of language and her analyses, often demonstrate a wider definition of reason that does not artificially omit or ostracize the effect of human emotions on perception and thought.  She brings in the emotions to better focus the picture and, when relevant, incorporates them into the decision.  Wahl's impact spanned the areas of women's equality, race, mental health, criminal law, and legal education.  

Larson described Wahl’s commitment to the common person and writing accessible opinions.  "In one case probably little remembered on the statewide scene, Huver v. Opatz, the issue was whether one rural township or another was to be held responsible for maintaining the roadside beside a particular stretch of county line road.  Justice Wahl drafted her opinions with her clerks by her side, and when we came to the section of the opinion in which the road is to be described, Justice Wahl refused to borrow the description from any of the briefs.  'Look in the trial court records for any photographs, any physical detail,' she told me.  “The people who live in those townships know this road like the back of their hand.  And this opinion will mean a tax increase for one group of citizens or the other.  The court’s opinion must communicate to them that we, too see this road as a real place, connecting real lives, like no other in the state.  It is not just some convenient geographical hook on which to hang an abstract legal principle.'

Judge Harriet Lansing commented further on the poetry of Wahl’s opinions.  "Rosalie’s inclusivity of landscape is one of the enduring delights of her opinions.  Her descriptions and metaphors of the heartland are great sources of strength.  Whether it is layering sod along a culvert in Kliniski v. Southdale Manor Inc., or observing a dew-laden bulldozer in Anderson v. American Casuality Col. Or listening to the rattle of old rain gutters beside a chicken coop in State v. Anderson you can see the meadow stretching beyond.  But my personal favorite is her evocation in In re Wang of a substantial evidence standards as “evidence with heft.”  I can see the threshers in the field and taste the lemon meringue pie for lunch.  Rosalie’s work in the judiciary has left indelible “evidence of heft,” and as a judge and as a citizen, I am grateful."

Wahl mentored women clerks.  One of her former clerks, Amy Adams, wrote, "I have never met anyone as fiercely committed to the preservation of individual dignity as Justice Wahl.  In every decision, every hearing, every encounter, she remained committed to the ideal that each person is entitled to decency and respect, and she granted that respect to everyone; justices, trial court judges, litigants, and attorneys.  I never saw Justice Wahl listen to an oral argument while sitting back in her chair.  She always leaned forward, giving each oralist her full attention, assuring each party that he or she was receiving a full and fair hearing of his or her argument."

She spearheaded and chaired the state taskforce on gender fairness and the courts; Minnesota was the sixth state to conduct such a study.  She then went on to chair the racial bias taskforce.  She was a longtime champion of the rights of the mentally ill.  “What is not so well known in the state where she lives is that Wahl’s contributions to legal education may have more national impact than her work as a state supreme court justice.”  Wahl was the first woman to chair the American Bar Association’s Accreditation Committee as well as the Section of Legal Education and Admissions to the Bar where she shrewdly and skillfully put together the strategy for expanding clinical legal education. She was a pivotal member of the National Association of Women Judges which awarded her the Joan Demsey Klein award honoree of the year award in 2004. The Minnesota State Bar Association named an annual award in her honor. Minnesota Women Lawyers named its annual lecture in her honor.  

Wahl recalls the exhilarating sense of making history and that women have learned the hard way that those holding power never share it until it becomes politically necessary to do so.  She chuckled over the local comic strip, Sally Forth, which shows the girl, Hilary, at Halloween admiring her costume of a black robe in the mirror.  She says to her mother, who holds the witch’s hat in her lap, “Oh put away the hat, I’ll just go as a Supreme Court Justice.”  She concludes, "Such evidence of increased participation is sweet, even though what I and others have experienced as dramatic leaps ahead are, in a larger perspective, only the slow erosion of individual and institutional sexism.  How can women judges make our increased participation most meaningful to the interests of other women and of our society?  Now that enough women are in the bar and on the bench to form a mass, a critical mass, large enough to be a catalyst, what are our responsibilities for change?  Women with access to power and status must not allow this to separate them from their knowledge of what it means to be female in this society.  Certainly every woman of accomplishment owes it to another woman to reach out and assist her growth and aspiration.  We are responsible, socially and individually, for helping other women achieve their desired goals.  Thus, in our own sphere, we work for the election or appointment of women judges to the bench.  Once there, we expect and anticipate women judges will fulfill expectations of judicial excellence."

Wahl served on the court until her retirement in 1994. She remained active in the community, regularly attending meetings from the Minnesota Women’s Consortium to Minnesota Women Lawyers, raising money for groups such as Leaders of Today and Tomorrow that encourages college-aged women to aspire to political leadership positions, and actively protesting the war in Iraq.

She died on July 22, 2013 at the age of 88.

Supreme Court Chief Justice Lorie Gildea issued a statement on the death of former Justice Wahl:

"Rosalie Wahl was a trailblazer for our state, both as a lawyer and as the first woman to serve on the Minnesota Supreme Court. While on the court she led efforts to address both gender fairness and racial bias in our state's justice system. She will be remembered with fondness and respect for her unwavering commitment to the principle of equal justice for all."  In an interview with Peter Shea done in 2003 she talks about her post-retirement role as a "public citizen," including her work as a peace activist.

The Minnesota Historical Society published Minneapolis Star Tribune columnist Lori Sturdevant's book,  Her Honor: Rosalie Wahl and the Minnesota Women's Movement, in 2014.

Nina Tottenburg narrates Emily Hoddad's documentary film about Wahl entitled, "The Girl from Birch Creek."

Stanford University Law Library's ABA Trailblazers project holds an interview of Wahl by Cara Lee Neville.

See also
List of female state supreme court justices

References

License note

External links
 Rosalie Wahl in MNopedia, the Minnesota Encyclopedia 
 Minnesota Historical Society Biography and Resources: Rosalie Wahl

1924 births
2013 deaths
People from Butler County, Kansas
Justices of the Minnesota Supreme Court
Public defenders
Minnesota lawyers
University of Kansas alumni
William Mitchell College of Law alumni
University of Minnesota Law School faculty
People from Caney, Kansas
American anti-war activists
20th-century American judges
20th-century American lawyers
20th-century American women judges